The Popular Department Store is a historic building in El Paso, Texas. It was built in 1917 for The Popular, a chain of department stores founded by Adolph Schwartz in El Paso in 1902. His heirs inherited the building, and they sold it in 1995; it later became the Fallas Department Store. The building was designed in the Chicago School architectural style by Trost & Trost. It has been listed on the National Register of Historic Places since September 24, 1980.

References

Buildings and structures completed in 1917		
National Register of Historic Places in El Paso County, Texas
Chicago school architecture in Texas
Trost & Trost buildings